Leslie Kenneth O'Brien, Baron O'Brien of Lothbury  (8 February 1908 – 24 November 1995) was Governor of the Bank of England.

After attending Wandsworth Grammar School in London, he joined the Bank of England in 1927 and rose through the ranks, becoming chief cashier in 1955, deputy governor in 1966, before serving as governor from 1966 until 1973.
As governor, O'Brien presided over the devaluation of the pound in 1967.

He became a Knight Grand Cross of the Order of the British Empire in 1967 and was appointed to the Privy Council in 1970. Following his retirement as governor in 1973 he was created a life peer as Baron O'Brien of Lothbury, of the City of London.

He married firstly Isabelle Pickett (1908–1987) in 1932, and secondly Marjorie Taylor (born 1923) in 1989. He died in Tandridge, Surrey, in 1995.

Arms

Footnotes

References

External links
Obituary: Lord O'Brien of Lothbury from The Independent

 
 

1908 births
1995 deaths
Crossbench life peers
Knights Grand Cross of the Order of the British Empire
Members of the Privy Council of the United Kingdom
Governors of the Bank of England
Deputy Governors of the Bank of England
Chief Cashiers of the Bank of England
20th-century English businesspeople
Life peers created by Elizabeth II